Dr. Dorothy Leland became the 19th president, and the second female president, of Georgia College & State University on January 1, 2004. She was appointed as the third Chancellor for University of California, Merced, on May 18, 2011, replacing Sung-Mo "Steve" Kang. In 2019 she announced plans to retire.

Leland has served on the board of directors of the American Association of State Colleges and Universities, Council for Higher Education Accreditation, the Georgia Chamber of Commerce and other local and state non-profit organization. She was a member of the NCAA Division II Presidents Council and has held leadership positions with the Council of Public Liberal Arts Colleges and the Southern University Conference.

Leland has received numerous awards and honors, including the Georgia Governor's Award for Historic Preservation. In 2008, she was recognized as a Purdue University Distinguished Alumni, and in 2009, she was named by Georgia Trend as one of four "Power Women" in Georgia.

Leland holds a B.A degree in English, a M.A. in American studies, and a Ph.D in philosophy, all from Purdue University. Her research area is contemporary continental philosophy, with a focus on gender and personal, social and cultural identity.

References

External links 

 Chancellor Emerita Dorothy Leland, 2011-2019: https://chancellor.ucmerced.edu/about-office/past-chancellors/leland
 UC Merced’s Leland Built a Higher Ed Legacy: https://www.diverseeducation.com/latest-news/article/15105348/uc-merceds-leland-built-a-higher-ed-legacy
 Georgia Department of Natural Resources, Board Minutes March 29, 2006: https://web.archive.org/web/20170211081412/http://www.gadnr.org/sites/uploads/dnr/pdf/minutes/board20060329.pdf
 "College of Liberal Arts names 2008 distinguished Alumni": https://news.uns.purdue.edu/x/2008a/080415SharpAlumni.html
 40th Anniversary Purdue Title IX Distinguished Service Award Recipients: http://www.purdue.edu/titleix/40years/40years.html
 "2009 Power Women", Georgia Trend, March 2009: http://www.georgiatrend.com/cover-story/03_09_powerwomen.shtml
 http://www.aascu.org/association/directors/index.htm
 https://web.archive.org/web/20110708112511/http://www.californiachronicle.com/articles/view/101430

University of California, Merced
Chancellors of campuses of the University of California
Georgia College & State University people
Purdue University alumni
Living people
Year of birth missing (living people)